Richard Oseran is an Arizona-born Jewish American lawyer and entrepreneur.  A third-generation Arizonan, Oseran practiced law for many years arguing before the U.S. Supreme Court.   He and his wife Shana have been instrumental in the early 21st-century revitalization of Downtown Tucson, Arizona.  Together they redeveloped the boutique historic Hotel Congress, the Cup Café, Club Congress, Maynards' Market and Maynards' kitchen.

Oseran was born in Phoenix, Arizona, on May 8, 1945, and moved to Tucson, Arizona, in 1963 to attend the University of Arizona and the University of Arizona James E. Rogers College of Law.  Richard and Shana were married in 1979 and spent a year in New Zealand.

In the early 1980s Oseran practiced civil litigation.

Hotel Congress
Richard and Shana Oseran with business partners purchased Hotel Congress in 1985, later become the sole owners. They created Club Congress and Cup Cafe. The Hotel Congress has become a cultural touchstone in downtown Tucson.

Oseran's Grandfather Jacob Oseransky started the Arizona Furniture Store in Phoenix, Arizona.  His mother, Bess Samuels, was born in Douglas Arizona in 1916. 
The Oseran Family sold guns to Pancho Villa during the Mexican revolution and were arrested but the charges later dropped.

Notes

References
 Wilensky, Sheila, With downtown Tucson hopping, Southern Arizona Jewish Post, Spet. 17, 2010 
 Charles, Lloyd, Hotel Congress Breaths History, Edible Baja Arizona, 2015.
 Ward, Coley, Arizona Daily Star, He is determined to make Downtown Trendy, December 7, 2007. 
 Seigel, Stephen, Club Congress Turns 20, Tucson Weekly, September 1, 2015.
 Higgins, Polly, Tucson Citizen, Messing with a Downtown Success? September 2, 2005.

Living people
Lawyers from Tucson, Arizona
American chief executives of travel and tourism industry companies
American people of Romanian-Jewish descent
20th-century American businesspeople
Businesspeople from Arizona
1945 births